Cashback may refer to:

 Cashback (film), two films directed by Sean Ellis
 Cashback reward program, a small amount paid to a customer by a credit card company for each use of a credit card
 Cashback website, a site where customers can earn cash rebates on online purchases that they make
 Debit card cashback, cash that shoppers receive along with their goods when paying by debit card
 Mortgage cashback, a lump sum given to a new borrower at the beginning of a mortgage term

See also
 
 Rebate (marketing), a sales promotion where customers receive money back after a purchase
 Loyalty program, a discount scheme used by retailers